The Queensland Australian of the Year Award is given annually on Australia Day. The announcement of the award has become a major public event in Australia, and is televised nationwide. The award "offers an insight into Australian identity, reflecting the nation's evolving relationship with world, the role of sport in Australian culture, the impact of multiculturalism, and the special status of Australia's Indigenous people".

The national level awards, four in total, are chosen exclusively from the state and territory award recipients.

The following is a list of the recipients of the Queensland Australian of the Year award.

See also
 List of Senior Australian of the Year Award recipients
 List of Young Australian of the Year Award recipients
 List of Australian Local Hero Award recipients
 List of South Australian of the Year Award recipients
 List of New South Wales Australian of the Year award recipients

References

Queenslanders
Lists of people from Queensland
People from Queensland